is a pharmaceutical company based in Japan. Its headquarters are in Chuo-ku, Osaka.

The original Dainippon Pharmaceuticals (Dainippon Seiyaku) was established in 1885 by Nagayo Sensai, a graduate of Tekijuku – the first private medical school in Japan established by Ogata Kōan. It was set up as a wholly privately-owned company funded by individuals from Tokyo and Osaka, with the land and buildings lent by the government. Technical expertise for the enterprise was provided by Shibata Shokei and Nagai Nagayoshi.

The company started its operation in 1885 with equipment imported from Germany. The main products were tincture and other similar drugs listed in the Japanese Pharmacopoeia. Among them was ephedrine, an anti-asthma drug invented by Nagai. In 1893, however, Nagai left the company and the business started to post operating losses. In 1898 it was acquired by Osaka Seiyaku (Osaka Pharmaceutical).

Another origin of the company began as Sumitomo Pharmaceuticals, incorporated in 1984 as a subsidiary of Sumitomo Chemical (holding 77.8% of the share as of 2006). Dainippon and Sumitomo merged on October 1, 2005, to create Dainippon Sumitomo Pharma. As a result, Sumitomo Chemical has 50.2% ownership in Dainippon Sumitomo Pharma as of March 31, 2014.

On April 1, 2022, the company was renamed from Sumitomo Dainippon Pharma to Sumitomo Pharma.

Notable Acquistions
Sunovion (formerly Sepracor Inc.), was acquired by then-Sumitomo Dainippon Pharma in 2010 for $2.6B. Sunovion remains a subsidiary of Sumitomo Pharma, with its headquarters in Marlborough, Massachusetts, USA.

In September 2016, the Sunovion subsidiary announced it would acquire Cynapsus Therapeutics for approximately $624 million, to expand Sunovion's central nervous system drug portfolio. With the deal, Sunovion would acquire Cynapsus’ then-Phase III Parkinson's disease candidate drug APL-130277, a sublingual formulation of apomorphine.

In September 2019, Sumitomo Dainippon Pharma announced a $3B upfront acquisition of five Roivant Sciences subsidiaries, including Urovant and Enzyvant 

In October 2022, Sumitomo Pharma announced the acquisition of all outstanding shares in Myovant, a former Roivant Sciences subsidiary it was previously a majority owner of, valuing the company at $2.9B.

List of mergers and acquisitions
The following is an illustration of the company's major mergers and acquisitions and historical predecessors:

Sumitomo Pharma (Previously-known as Dainippon Sumitomo Pharma)
 Sunovion (Acq 2010)
 IBF Biotechnics (Acq 1991)
 New England Pharmaceuticals (Acq 1995)
 Oryx Pharmaceuticals (Acq 2008)
 Elevation Pharmaceuticals (Acq 2012)
 Cynapsus Therapeutics (Acq 2016)
 Boston Biomedical (Acq 2012)
 Tolero Pharmaceuticals (Acq 2016)
 Myovant (Acq 2019)
 Urovant (Acq 2019)
 Enzyvant (Acq 2019)
 Altavant (Acq 2019)
 Spirovant (Acq 2019)

References

External links 

 Sumitomo Pharma 
 Sumitomo Pharma 
 Official website (Archive)
  Wiki collection of bibliographic works on Sumitomo Pharma

Pharmaceutical companies of Japan
Companies based in Osaka
Companies listed on the Tokyo Stock Exchange
Pharmaceutical companies established in 1885
Japanese companies established in 1885
Veterinary medicine companies
Sumitomo Group